Lost Island Lake is a  lake north of Ruthven, Iowa, United States.

References

Iowa Lakes Information System: Lost Island Lake, Summary Data Table

External links
https://web.archive.org/web/20080518032924/http://www.emmetsburg.com/recreation/lo-lake.htm
http://findlakes.com/lost_island_lake_iowa_vacation.htm
http://www.ruthvenlostisland.com/
http://www.stateparks.com/lost_island_lake.html

Lakes of Iowa
Bodies of water of Clay County, Iowa
Bodies of water of Palo Alto County, Iowa